The Icarian Rhapsody is a single-movement composition for string orchestra by the American composer Mason Bates.  It was composed in 1999 and was first performed November 14, 2003 by the Oakland East Bay Symphony under conductor Michael Morgan.

Composition
The Icarian Rhapsody has a duration of roughly 12 minutes and is composed in one continuous movement.  The title of the work is inspired by the character Icarus from Greek mythology.  Bates wrote about this inspiration in the score program notes:

Reception
Reviewing the world premiere, Joshua Kosman of the San Francisco Chronicle described the Icarian Rhapsody as "an appealingly crafted work for strings" and called it "lovely to hear and ingeniously constructed, even if the actual thematic material seemed a little thin."  In 2013, Charles T. Downey of The Washington Post also described the piece favorably, saying, "sonic and rhythmic effects were piled up by minimalistic repetition until the voyage finally dissolved in a few wispy contrails of harmonics."  Aaron Keebaugh of the Boston Classical Review similarly called it "a kaleidoscope of effects" and wrote:

References

Compositions by Mason Bates
1999 compositions
Compositions for string orchestra
Rhapsodies